Haplocelis is a genus of worms belonging to the family Isodiametridae.

The species of this genus are found in Western America.

Species:
 Haplocelis dichona (Marcus, 1954)

References

Acoelomorphs